is a professional Japanese baseball player. He plays pitcher for the Yomiuri Giants.

References 

1997 births
Living people
Baseball people from Ibaraki Prefecture
Japanese baseball players
Nippon Professional Baseball pitchers
Yomiuri Giants players
People from Hitachinaka, Ibaraki